André Azoulay (Berber: ⴰⵏⴷⵔⵉ ⴰⵣⵓⵍⴰⵢ, born 17 April 1941) is a Moroccan Jewish senior adviser to king Mohammed VI of Morocco. He previously advised Mohammed's father, king Hassan II. He currently presides over the Anna Lindh Euro-Mediterranean Foundation for the Dialogue Between Cultures, based in Alexandria, Egypt. He is also President of the executive committee of the Foundation for the Three Cultures and the Three Religions, based in Seville, Spain, a founding member of the C-100 Davos Forum for the Dialogue of Civilisations and religions, and was formerly Executive Vice-president of the BNP Paribas, Paris. His daughter is UNESCO Director-General Audrey Azoulay.

Early life
Born in Essaouira, in 1941 to a Berber Moroccan Jewish family, Azoulay was educated in Paris where he studied economics, journalism, and international relations. Previously to his current position as Counsellor to the King of Morocco, Azoulay had a long career within the Paribas Bank in Paris (1968 to 1990) where, as Executive Vice-president, he covered the Middle East and North Africa Region as well as heading the bank's public affairs department.

As a counselor of the late King Hassan II from (1991 to 1999), and since then of King Mohammed VI, André Azoulay has largely contributed to the implementation of economic reforms, which have been applied throughout the kingdom since their inception in the early 1990s. He also played a significant role in the privatization and deregulation programs which began in 1993. He emphasized the need for sustaining the role of the private sector and encouraging international investment to sustain economic growth in Morocco. Azoulay has also largely contributed to promoting Morocco throughout the world.

Peace builder
Azoulay is also known for his historical input in the follow-up of the peace process in the Middle East and the many initiatives he has been involved in the perspective of deepening the logic of reconciliation between Jews and Muslims. In addition to his professional responsibilities André Azoulay has always fought for peace and dialogue between the Arab Muslim World and that of the Jewish communities in Europe, the United States, Morocco as well as the Arab, Berber and Jewish diasporas worldwide.

For over 40 years, Azoulay has taken an active part in supporting the activities of different movements and associations whose vocation is the two-state solution (Palestine and Israel) and to help the process of better understanding and mutual respect between Islam and the Western World.

As president of the executive committee of the Foundation of the Three Cultures and the Three Religions, based in Seville (Spain), Azoulay is one of the founders of the Aladin Group (Paris) created to promote mutual knowledge and intercultural relations among Muslims and Jews.

In August 2005, Azoulay was also nominated member of the "High-Level Group" for the "Alliance of Civilizations, set up by the United Nations. Instigated by Spain and co-sponsored by Turkey, this initiative is addressing the issue of the relations between Islam and the Western world.

In this context, Azoulay was elected on 5 March 2008 and reelected on 9 September 2011 as President of the Euro-Mediterranean Anna Lindh Foundation, and a member of the Executive Committee of the Mediterranean Council for Culture (Paris). He is also a board member of the Mediterranean Study and Research Centre (Marseille), the Yala online leadership Academy, and the Institut de Prospective et d’Etudes pour le Monde Méditerranéen (Paris).

A member of the Board of Al Akhawayne University (Ifrane), the Mediterranean University (Fès), and the High Council of the Alliance Israelite Universelle, Azoulay belongs to the Scientific Committee of "Medinas" a think-tank created by the World Bank and the European Investment Bank to protect, restore and promote the "Medinas" in the Arab World. He is also a member of the boards of the Institute Pierre Mendès-France (Paris) and YALA (Young Araba Leaders for Peace).

Belonging to the boards of several economic and financial institutions, Azoulay is a member of the Royal Academy of Morocco and of the Royal Academy of Spain for Economic and Financial Sciences.  He has been honored with the title of "Commandeur dans l’Ordre du Trône" (Morocco) and he has received many awards and titles of honor throughout the world (France, Spain, Italy, Germany, UK, Portugal, Brazil, Mexico, Argentina). Azoulay received the Lifetime Achievement Award from the American Sephardi Federation in New York, where Enrico Macias and David Serero performed during the ceremony in his honor.

Essaouira

With his wife Katia, also born in Essaouira, who published 2 books "Essaouira-Mogador : Parfums d’Enfance" and "Essaouira-Mogador : Passion partagée", Azoulay is the architect of the renaissance of the city they both hold very dear to their hearts. He is active in the promotion and revival of his home town which has a specific place in the historical, cultural, and spiritual heritage of Morocco. He is the founder and president of the Association Essaouira-Mogador, which was established in 1992 as an original approach to the sustainable development of the city based on its cultural diversity and spiritual legacy.

Essaouira hosts seven music festivals a year, ranging from classical to lyrical. They include the renowned Gnaoua World Music Festival, the Chamber Music with "le Printemps Musical des Alizés" and the rich Judeo-Muslim repertoire of the Andalusian-Atlantic Festival, a unique event in the world inviting on the same stage, every year, poets, musicians and singers, Muslims and Jews, to keep alive and to perform their common heritage and legacy.

See also
 Foreign relations of Morocco

References

Further reading

External links
 Interview with André Azoulay: "The Dialogue between the Cultures Is My Life's Work"

1941 births
21st-century Moroccan people
Advisors of Mohammed VI of Morocco
Advisors to Hassan II of Morocco
Berber Jews
Living people
Berber Moroccans
20th-century Moroccan businesspeople
Member of the Academy of the Kingdom of Morocco
Moroccan business executives
Moroccan emigrants to France
Jewish Moroccan politicians
People from Essaouira